Royalty is the seventh studio album by American singer Chris Brown. It was released on December 18, 2015, by CBE and RCA Records. The album was anticipated by the mixtape Before the Party, released as its prelude, and serves as the follow-up to his sixth album X (2014). The album is named after the singer's  daughter, Royalty Brown, whom the album is dedicated to.

Royalty is mainly an R&B and alternative R&B album, also containing songs with influences of funk, pop and trap music. Its lyrical content was described by Brown as a "representation of where i was in my life at that point". For the album Brown collaborated chiefly with underground artists and producers, being Brown's record with fewer featurings as well. The album received mixed reviews from music critics, with criticism relating to the album's content.

The album debuted at number three on the US Billboard 200, selling 184,000 units in its first week, marking an improvement over Brown's last three studio albums. It also became his seventh solo album consecutive top ten debut in the United States. Royalty was certified Platinum by the Recording Industry Association of America (RIAA), for combined equivalent units of 1,000,000 units.

Four singles preceded the album's release: "Liquor", "Zero", "Back to Sleep", and "Fine by Me". Its third single "Back to Sleep" became the album's biggest success, peaking at number 20 on the US Billboard Hot 100. Brown directed and released eight music videos for the songs of album, serializing them to construct a linear story.

Background and recording
In February 2015, Brown said, during an interview for The Breakfast Club, that he started working on the album going for a funky direction inspired by "overseas" music. During the progression of the album he discovered that he had a daughter and simultaneously broke up with his ex-girlfriend Karrueche Tran. That happening made him change the idea for the project, ending up doing mostly R&B songs that he described as "a screenshot of my emotional state at that point". He then wanted to release two different versions of the album, an urban one for the US market, and a worldwide version with pop-funk songs, but he ended up releasing most of the pop-funk songs on an EP called Royalty International - EP, keeping for the album mostly urban records.
                                                                                                                                              
Recording sessions for Royalty took place in late 2014 and throughout 2015 at Record Plant in Los Angeles, California. In November 2015, during an interview with Hot 97, Brown explained the significance of the title, named after his daughter Royalty Brown:
 On the same interview he also explained the lyrical content saying "I wanted to show every aspect of my life now singularly, I wanted to show every environment that I'm living right now, and different environments require different parts of my personality, so there will be different songs with different themes, that show every aspect of my lifestyle and my feelings now". Brown said that the reason why Royalty is his record with fewer featurings is because he thought that "this body of work had to be about me. Me getting my rhythm back into doing my thing, and my evolution as a man into becoming a father. It's about the life that i am living right now, and i wanted to tell it by myself" ending up saying that "on this album you hear what I've been through, where I'm at, and where I'm tryna go, all in one".

Composition 
Royalty is an R&B and PBR&B album, containing influences of funk, trap and pop music. For the album, Brown took a 'mixtape approach', with its varied sound and by collaborating mainly with underground artists and producers. Its lyrical content mostly focuses on libidinal sexual adventures, also facing themes of lovesickness, fast life and unconditional love.
                                                            
The opening track, "Back to Sleep" is an R&B slow jam about late night sex, that features beats and minor influences of funk music, reminiscent of Marvin Gaye's 1982 song "Sexual Healing". "Fine by Me" is a synthwave, disco and R&B song that talks about how the singer feels comfortable with not being the love interest of a lady, but only her sex partner, inspired by 80's music. "Wrist" is a trap song with some heavy influences from R&B and hip hop. Lewis Kromer of Pitchfork defined the track as "a syrupy thumper blending hip-hop and R&B, almost serving as a Southern update of his 2011 hit “Look at Me Now”. "Make Love" is a slow jam that has a pure R&B style, inspired by 90's music. "Liquor" is an alternative R&B song with heavy influences from psychedelic and soul music. "Zero" and "No Filter" are disco and funk records that were compared by some critics to the work of American band Chic and French electronic music duo Daft Punk, with lyrics that have been described as "unapologetic". "Anyway" is a dance-pop song which features an auto-tuned chorus sung by Tayla Parx. "Picture Me Rollin’" is a g-funk song about living the thug life, that features different references from west coast rap. "Who's Gonna (Nobody)" is a lascivious R&B and alternative R&B slow-jam, that interpolates "Nobody" performed by Keith Sweat featuring Athena Cage.

"Proof" and "Discover" are PBR&B songs with lyrics about painful perspetives in love relationships. "Proof" was described by Brad Wete of Billboard as “a slow-winding tornado where he struggles to mend a relationship mangled by lies and insecurity. He's severed ties with exes and uses lines like “Whenever shit got deep, I would’ve drowned for you” as evidence of his dedication"”, while "Discover" was evidenced for its "dreamy atmosphere" and "sorrowing vocals". The album's standard edition ends with "Little More", a pop record where the singer explains to his daughter his love for her.

"Day One", the first song of the deluxe edition, is a trap and PBR&B song, with a dark tune and fast rapping, where Brown's voice is auto-tuned. In the song Brown expresses the importance of loyalty, emphasizing the faithfulness of his girlfriend. "KAE" is an alternative R&B song where Brown's voice is edited to make it sound like Brown's ex-girlfriend, Karrueche Tran, is singing her perspective of their relationship. The album's deluxe edition last track, "U Did It", is an "atmospheric" slow alternative R&B song, which features some trap music elements.

Artwork 
The artwork of the album was revealed On October 16, 2015, and shot by Italian award-winning photographer Francesco Carrozzini, portraying Brown holding Royalty in his arms while she is sleeping, in a black and white picture. The photoshoot for the album took place in October 2015, few days before the announcement of the album cover. Billboard described the cover as a "tender representation of Brown's private feelings". Rap-Up said that the cover shows "a genuine intimate portrait of father and daughter".

Release and promotion 
Brown previewed snippets of songs that he was working on during the last months of 2014 and throughout 2015, by posting short videos on his social media accounts or by performing them at some club appearances. The songs previewed were "'Till The Morning", "I Want Ya", "Start It Slow", "Zero", "Liquor", "Day One", "Side Piece", "The 80s", "Right Now", "Die Young", "Who You Came With", "To The Side", "Blood On My Hands", "KAE", "Make Me Jealous", "Freak On", "Sedated", "Go", "Parachute" and "Fine by Me".

On June 25, 2015, Chris Brown announced that his seventh album would've been released during autumn 2015. On the day after, he released the album's lead single, titled "Liquor". On August 22, 2015, the singer revealed on his Twitter, that his new album would've been titled "Royalty", in honor of his daughter (named Royalty Brown).

On October 13, 2015, Brown announced that Royalty would've been released on November 27, 2015. On October 16, 2015, he has revealed the album cover. After it was revealed that the album has been pushed back to December 18, 2015, in exchange on November 27, 2015, he released a free 34-track mixtape, called Before the Party, as a prelude to Royalty. The mixtape features guest appearances from Rihanna, Wiz Khalifa, Pusha T, Wale, Tyga, French Montana and Fetty Wap. On October 16, 2015, the album cover was revealed.

On December 4, 2015, the track "Wrist" featuring Solo Lucci, was released as part of the countdown single, with the pre-order of the album on December 4, 2015. On December 11, 2015, the track "Anyway" was released as an instant grat with pre-orders. The following day on iTunes it was possible to listen the first 30 seconds of every track from the album as a preview.
                                                                                                                    
Brown promoted the album doing several radio interviews, and also by performing tracks of the album live in various televised shows, such as Jimmy Kimmel Live!, Taraji & Terrence's White Hot Holidays Power 106 Cali Christmas 2015 and at the 3rd iHeartRadio Music Awards. Brown also did three shows leading up to the December 18 release date of Royalty, all at relatively small venues for the arena-touring singer, to promote the release. The live shows took place on December 13 at the Aragon Ballroom in Chicago, on December 16 at The Masonic in San Francisco, and on December 18 at Hollywood Palladium in Los Angeles.

The album was released on December 18, 2015, by CBE and RCA with a standard version with 14 tracks, an international deluxe edition with 4 more tracks, and a Japanese and f.y.e. deluxe edition with 2 more tracks than the international deluxe edition. Eventually, on Christmas Day, the EP Royalty International, was released. The 4-track EP contained the two tracks that were only available on the Japanese deluxe edition as well.

Singles
The album's lead single, "Liquor" was released on June 26, 2015. The song was produced by ToneStith. On September 22, 2015, the music video premiered, sharing along with the music video for "Zero". The song has since peaked at number 60 on the US Billboard Hot 100.

The album's second single, "Zero" was released on September 18, 2015. The song was produced by Riley Bell, Matthew Burnett and Tushar Apte. On September 22, 2015, the music video was released for "Zero", while sharing along with the music video for "Liquor". The song has since peaked at number 80 on the US Billboard Hot 100.

The song, titled "Back to Sleep" was premiered via SoundCloud on November 5, 2015. It was officially released as the album's third single on November 9, 2015. The song was produced by Vinylz and Boi-1da. On December 14, 2015, Brown uploaded and released the music video for "Back to Sleep" on his YouTube and Vevo account. The video begins, after the conclusion of Brown's "Fine By Me" music video. The song has since peaked at number 20 on the US Billboard Hot 100 making it Brown's highest-charting single from Royalty in the United States.

"Fine by Me" was released, along with the pre-order on iTunes on November 26, 2015. On the following day, it was officially released as the album's fourth single. The song was produced by The Monsters and the Strangerz. The video begins at the end of his video "Zero", and shows a clip from his other video "Liquor".

Other songs 
The track "Wrist" featuring Solo Lucci, was released as part of the countdown single, with the pre-order of the album on December 4, 2015. On December 15, 2015, Brown uploaded the music video from the song.

The track "Anyway" was released as an instant grat with pre-orders on December 11, 2015. It was produced by BLAQTUXEDO and features guest appearances from Tayla Parx.

The music video for "Picture Me Rollin’" was uploaded and released on December 17, 2015. Scott Disick, French Montana, Cal Scruby, Kid Red, ASAP Ferg, and ASAP Rocky, all make their cameo appearances in this video.

On December 18, 2015, Brown uploaded the music video for "Little More (Royalty)" on his YouTube and Vevo account. The song has since peaked at number 91 on the US Billboard Hot 100.

Music video series
Brown directed and released eight music videos for Royalty, serializing them to construct a linear story.

Plot
Chris Brown is first seen drowning his sorrows at a bar alone when a mysterious woman buys him a drink and gives it to him after slipping a drug into it. After reluctantly drinking it, Brown loses control of his senses and leaves with the woman to her home, but Brown is under the effect of the drug and sees everything in a psychedelic way as his eyes turn temporarily neon green ("Liquor"). After the night spent with the mysterious woman, Brown then takes a taxi home, only to find a girl he has been seeing throwing his clothes off a balcony because she did not know where he was. Rather than get into an argument, Brown decides to gather his boys and go out. Afterwards, he starts dancing in an alley and moves his way into a laundromat with his crew before taking the stage at a downtown theater and meeting up with Dan Bilzerian ("Zero").

After Brown leaves his crew, another woman catches his attention. He follows her to a building containing a high tech fighting arena. Suddenly, an old man's face appears on the screen and tells Brown that he owns the substance that was slipped into his drink back at the bar and wants it back via Brown's blood. Realizing he was tricked in the first place, Brown is forced to fight the old man's henchmen, but easily dispatches them with his heightened physical abilities derived from the drug and escapes, though the old man tells the second woman to follow him ("Fine By Me"). Brown then calls his girlfriend and heads over to her place, where they make love through the night ("Back to Sleep").

Brown wakes up and goes for a walk, but is caught by the old man's henchwoman who drugs him again with a dust-like substance. In another trance-like sequence, Brown is dragged into another dark room by the henchwoman, inter-cut with clips of him and rapper Solo Lucci performing and dancing to "Wrist". She seduces him as he is tied to a chair, then tries to slit his throat, but Brown glitches out of his trap and the henchwoman is bound to the chair in his stead, allowing his escape. Brown calls his girlfriend again to try to explain everything, but she is fed up and claims she is "done", ignoring any further calls from him. She then meets another man who asks her out on a date while she works out with her friends, but the man stands her up when they are supposed to meet. Brown sees his dejected girlfriend walk into a club and with his crew's encouragement, reconciles with her inside the club and leads a dance number ("Anyway"). While Brown and his girlfriend leave, the man from earlier bumps into them and upon hearing the man call his girlfriend "love", Brown punches him, which leads to another argument resulting in Brown's girlfriend leaving him for good.

While Brown sulks, another of his friends (Scott Disick) calls him, inviting him to go to a house party that coincidentally takes place at his own house, which Brown reluctantly accepts as "Picture Me Rollin'" starts to play. While Brown cheers himself up at the party, the old man himself appears and confronts Brown, saying "we can do this the easy way or the hard way". Brown's friends, including Disick, French Montana and ASAP Rocky, step in and toss the thug out while Brown escapes.

Brown is then seen tossing in his sleep inter-cut with flashbacks from the earlier videos, in addition to new footage of his girlfriend struggling to accept her pregnancy. He then wakes up in his bed and finds a toddler, revealed to be his own daughter Royalty, sitting next to him. Initially confused, he realizes the previous experiences were likely a dream and begins to play with Royalty in a musical montage ("Little More (Royalty)"), proclaiming his fatherly love for her and how she brings out the best in him. The video series ends as the same green flash in Brown's eyes from earlier appears for a second in Royalty's eyes.

Critical reception

Royalty received mixed reviews from music critics. According to review aggregator Metacritic, the album's average score was 59/100, indicating "mixed, or average reviews." Los Angeles Timess Mikael Wood expressed a positive response, and complimented its music as "[carrying] a convincing bad-guy energy that’s all the more potent for its sweet, often luscious textures.

Brad Wete of Billboard gave the album a lukewarm three and a half stars out of five, "“Proof”-like cuts prove Brown can make quality songs about relationship dynamics", while also stating that " And he probably should, for the sake of a well-rounded output." Continuing with his conflicted feelings towards its sexually-driven songs, he argued that "Admittedly, a rich 26-year-old bachelor’s life is full of romps with women and wild nights. Fame, access, and talent bring those with ease. This seems to be an art imitating life thing. But if and when Brown ascends to the next level, it likely will be because he starts talking about the morning after. It’s time for him to wake up."Allmusic editor Andy Kellman expressed a mixed response saying that the album "is not a farther away from the X-rated material full of carousing and belligerence that have dominated his work since Exclusive, as the cover might've suggested", and stated "The majority of what follows is a qualitative step back from previous solo album X."

Marcus Dowling of HipHopDX gave the album a 2.5 out of 5, and on his review stated that "While showing progression here, Chris Brown still is quite far from being the best man and artist that he can be. On Royalty, Chris Brown shows what happens when Peter Pan tries to grow up, but loves turning up in the club even more.." Michael Arcenhaux of Complex was rather negative in his review, and gave the album a score of 2 out of 5 stars, and started off the review saying that if he had one word to describe the album, "it would be mistake.", and that "Royalty is many things all at once though much of it is not particularly good."

Commercial performance
Royalty debuted at number three on the US Billboard 200 selling 184,000 equivalent copies (162,000 in pure album sales) behind Justin Bieber's Purpose and 25 by Adele. It was the second best-selling album of the week. The album was Brown's sixth solo album to debut at number one on the Billboard Top R&B/Hip-Hop Albums. Royalty was also streamed 17.3 million times in the first week. The album debuted at number 23 on the UK Albums Chart and number-one on the UK R&B Chart, becoming Brown's fifth number-one on that chart.

The sales for Royalty marked an improvement over Brown's last three studio albums, with the former two peaking higher, but selling less in their first week's of release, while the collaboration with Tyga sold 51,000 copies in its first week, peaking at number 6. Despite having greater first week sales than his three previous albums, this is his third-lowest peak position for one of his solo studio albums. In its second week, the album remained in the top ten at Billboard 200, fell to number 8, selling 55,000 equivalent copies (36,000 in pure album sales). In its third week, the album dropped down to number 12 on the chart, selling 29,000 equivalent copies (17,000 in pure album sales). In the fourth week the album fell to number 14 on the Billboard 200 chart, selling 23,000 equivalent copies (12,000 in pure album sales). The album sold 19,000 copies (10,000 in pure album sales) in its fifth week. As of March 2016, Royalty has sold 360,000 copies in the United States. Royalty was certified platinum by the Recording Industry Association of America (RIAA), for combined album sales, on-demand audio, video streams, track sales equivalent of 1,000,000 units.

Track listing
Credits adapted from the album's liner notes.

Notes
 signifies a co-producer
 signifies an additional producer
"Back to Sleep" features background vocals from August Rigo
"Fine by Mine" and "Zero" features background from Talay Riley
"Anyway" features additional vocals from Taylor Parks
"No Filter" features background vocals from Josh Cumbee, Ilan Kidron, Afshin Salmani, Nat Dunn and Terrence Coles

Sample credits
"Picture Me Rollin’" contains elements of "Regulate", written by Warren Griffin II, Nathaniel Hale, Jerry Leiber, Mike Stoller and performed by Nate Dogg featuring Warren G, and "Funk You Up", written by Gwendolyn Chisolm, Cheryl Cook, Sylvia Robinson, Angela Stone and performed by The Sequence.
"Who's Gonna (Nobody)" contains elements of "Nobody", written by Scott Fitzgerald, Keith Sweat and performed by Keith Sweat featuring Athena Cage.
"Discover" contains elements of "Little City Slikers", written by Steven Rehbein, Richard Braun and performed by Auracle.
"Proof" contains elements of "My Heart Belongs to U", written by Donald DeGrate, Cedric Hailey and performed by Jodeci.

Personnel 
Credits for Royalty adapted from Allmusic.

Chris Brown – composer, creative director, executive producer, primary artist
Afsheen – producer
Lyrica Anderson – composer
Tushar Apte – composer, drum Programming, keyboards, producer
Aquarius – producer
The Aristocrats – programming
Nicolò Arquilla – composer
Daniele Autore – composer, producer
Ayọ – producer
B.A.M. – producer
Riley Bell – additional production, composer
Adrian Bent – guitar (bass)
Floyd Bentley – composer, producer
Rian Glen Beriones – composer
Andre "Drenative" Blake – composer
Boi Ida – producer
Jason Boyd – composer
Barry "Mijo" Bradford – composer
Richard Braun – composer
Matthew Burnett – composer, drum programming, keyboards, producer
Francesco Carrozzini – photography
Maddox Chhim – assistant
Cheryl Cook – composer
Tom Coyne – mastering
Josh Cumbee – composer, engineer, guitar, keyboards, producer, programming, vocals (background)
Terrence De Carlo Coles – composer
Wesley "Dj Wes" Dees – composer
Donald Degrate – composer
DJ Wes – producer
Jocelyn a. Donald – composer
Michael Dorsey – composer
Christopher Dotson – composer, producer
Sean Douglas – composer
Nat Dunn – vocals (background)
Natalie Dunn – composer
Kenneth Edmonds – composer
Scott Fitzgerald – composer
Askia Fountain – composer
James Foye III – composer
Kenneth "K-Smack" Franklin – composer
Chris Galland – assistant
Jimmy Giannos – composer
Edward Griffin – composer
Warren Griffin III – composer
Cedric Hailey – composer
Anderson Hernandez – composer
Michael Hernandez – composer, producer
Andrew Hey – composer
Nate Hills – composer
Brandon Hodge – composer
Chaz Jackson – composer
Jaycen Joshua – mixing

Jordan Johnson – composer
Stefan Johnson – composer, engineer
Jamal Jones – composer
Dominic Jordan – composer
Ryan Kaul – assistant
Ilan Kidron – composer, vocals (background)
Chris King – engineer
Ian Kirkpatrick – composer, producer, programming
Jerry Leiber – composer
Darius Logan – composer
Dominique Logan – composer
Marcus Lomax – composer
The Mekanics – producer
The Monsters – producer, programming
Caleb Nordelus – composer, producer
Gabrielle "Goldie" Nowee – composer
Austin Owens – composer
Taylor Parks – composer, vocals, featured artist
Mark Pitts – composer, executive producer
Polow da Don – producer
Poo Bear – producer
JHawk - producer
Razihel – producer
Steven Rehbein – composer
August Rigo – composer, vocals (background)
Talay Riley – composer, vocals (background)
Allen Ritter – composer, producer
Afshin Salmani – composer, engineer, keyboards, programming, vocals (background)
Omega Sampson – composer
Matthew Samuels – composer
Ike Schultz – assistant
Lisa Scinta – composer
Darryl Simmons – composer
Natalie Sims - composer
Aaron Lamont Small – composer
Solo Lucci – featured artist
Brian Springer	Vocal – engineer
Antonio "Tone" Stith – composer, producer
Mike Stoller – composer
Angela Stone – composer
Strangerz – producer, programming
Keith Sweat – composer
T-Coles – vocals (background)
Keith Thomas – A&R
Bryson Tiller – composer
Bobby Joseph Turner, Jr. – composer
Blaq Tuxedo – producer
Keyz of the Upperclassmen – producer
Melvin Villanueva – composer
Vinylz – producer
Courtney Walter – art direction, creative director, design
Irvin Whitlow – composer
Dewain Whitmore, Jr. – composer
Orlando Williamson – composer

Charts

Weekly charts

Year-end charts

Certifications

Release history

See also
 List of UK R&B Albums Chart number ones of 2015
 List of Billboard number-one R&B/hip-hop albums of 2016

References

External links
 

2015 albums
Chris Brown albums
Albums produced by Allen Ritter
Albums produced by Boi-1da
Albums produced by C.P Dubb
Albums produced by Danja (record producer)
Albums produced by the Monsters & Strangerz
Albums produced by Polow da Don
Albums produced by Poo Bear
Albums produced by Vinylz
RCA Records albums
Alternative R&B albums